Kishori Lal is an Indian politician of the Bharatiya Janata Party, and a member of the Himachal Pradesh Legislative Assembly from 2007-2012 and won again in 2017 elections. He represented the Baijnath constituency in Kangra district. Recently he lost in 2022 assembly elections.

References 

People from Kullu district
Bharatiya Janata Party politicians from Himachal Pradesh
21st-century Indian politicians
Himachal Pradesh politicians
Year of birth missing
Himachal Pradesh MLAs 2007–2012
Himachal Pradesh MLAs 2017–2022
2017 deaths